Bjorn 'El Toro' Ruytinx (born 18 August 1980) is a retired Belgian professional football player who last played for Halen in the Belgian Provincial Leagues as a forward.

Career
Ruytinx spent most of his career with OH Leuven, where he was signed in 2002 when the team was playing in the Belgian Third Division. With OH Leuven he enjoyed promotion to the Belgian Second Division in 2005 and to the Belgian Pro League in 2011. After staying with the team for a decade (and becoming a club-icon in the process), Ruytinx finally moved to Oostende in 2014. At Oostende, he regularly featured in the squad during his first season, however during his second season he did not play a single minute and as such he moved to third division team Beerschot Wilrijk during the winter 2015–16 transfer window. After a following season at Hasselt and a final one at his initial club Halen, Ruytinx retired in 2019.

References

External links
 

1980 births
Living people
Belgian footballers
Belgian Pro League players
Challenger Pro League players
Oud-Heverlee Leuven players
K.V. Oostende players
K Beerschot VA players
Association football forwards